Musanase Laura (born 1993), is a Rwandan actress. Laura is best known for the role of 'Nikuze' in the television sitcom City Maid.

Personal life
She was born in Tanzania, but raised in Rwanda, in a family with six siblings. She attended Bright Academy Primary School in Nyagatare District. Later she attended Lycée de Kigali for her secondary education and finally FAWE Girls’ School. She currently lives in Gisozi, Gasabo district.

Career
She made her acting debut with a leading role in the television sitcom City Maid. Her role became highly popular with the public. She left the role for a few years, but later confirmed that she would return the serial soon. She was also nominated in the Best Actress category in the Rwanda Movie Awards.

Filmography

References

External links
 
 Some of the well-known in Rwandan cinema are proud of its achievements

Rwandan actresses
Living people
1993 births
People from Gasabo District